Margaret of Bar (1220–1275) was a daughter of Henry II of Bar and his wife Philippa of Dreux. She was Countess of Luxembourg by her marriage to Henry V of Luxembourg. She is also known as Marguerite of Bar.

Family 
Margaret's maternal grandparents were Robert II of Dreux (whose father's father was King Louis VI of France) and his second wife Yolanda de Coucy. Her paternal grandparents were Theobald I of Bar and his second wife Ermesinde of Brienne.

Margaret was the eldest of seven children born to her parents. Her brother was Theobald II of Bar.  Margaret's sister, Jeanne married Frédéric de Blamont. The rest of her siblings died young or unmarried.

Marriage 
In 1240, Margaret married Henry V of Luxembourg. Margaret was twenty years old, and Henry was twenty-four.

Margaret brought Henry Ligny-en-Barrois as her dowry, however, by a clause in the marriage contract, it remained under the feudal suzerainty of the county of Bar. In contempt of this, Henry paid homage in 1256 to Theobald II of Navarre, in his capacity as Count of Champagne. Margaret's brother, Theobald II of Bar, took advantage of the conflict then raging between Frederick III of Lorraine (their cousin) and the bishops of Metz. Henry V was a partisan of the duke and so Theobald took the side of the bishop. Henry was captured in battle at Prény on 14 September 1266. On 8 September 1268, King Louis IX arbitrated between the two counts and Henry was freed and repossessed of Ligny, but under the suzerainty of the Barrois.

Margaret and Henry had seven children:
Henry VI (died 1288), Count of Luxembourg
Waleran I (died 1288), Count of Ligny & Roussy
Isabelle (1247–1298), married Guy of Dampierre
Philippa (1252–1311), married John II, Count of Holland
Margaret
Felicitas
Joanna (died 1310), Abbess of Clairefontaine

Margaret and Henry made peace with Guy of Dampierre by marrying him to their daughter, Isabelle. Their other daughter, Philippa married John II, Count of Holland and became grandparents to Philippa, Queen of England and Margaret II, Countess of Hainault.

Margaret died in 1275, six years before her husband's death.

Ancestors

References

1220 births
1275 deaths
13th-century French women
13th-century French people
Countesses of Luxembourg